Lauri Taipale (11 September 1911 – 21 February 1950) was a Finnish footballer. He played in nine matches for the Finland national football team from 1934 to 1937. He was also part of Finland's team for their qualification matches for the 1938 FIFA World Cup.

References

External links
 

1911 births
1950 deaths
Finnish footballers
Finland international footballers
Place of birth missing
Association footballers not categorized by position